The 1979 season was the tenth season of national competitive association football in Australia and 96th overall.

National teams

Australia national soccer team

Results and fixtures

Friendlies

Australia national under-20 soccer team

Australia women's national soccer team

Results and fixtures

Friendlies

Men's socer

National Soccer League

Cup competitions

NSL Cup

Final

Retirements
 10 December 1979: Jim Mangopoulos, former Heidelberg United player.

References

External links
 Football Australia official website

1979 in Australian soccer
Seasons in Australian soccer